The University of London (UoL; abbreviated as Lond or more rarely Londin in post-nominals) is a federal public research university located in London, England, United Kingdom. The university was established by royal charter in 1836 as a degree-awarding examination board for students holding certificates from University College London and King's College London and "other such other Institutions, corporate or unincorporated, as shall be established for the purpose of Education, whether within the Metropolis or elsewhere within our United Kingdom". This fact allows it to be one of three institutions to claim the title of the third-oldest university in England, and moved to a federal structure in 1900. It is now incorporated by its fourth (1863) royal charter and governed by the University of London Act 2018.

It was the first university in the United Kingdom to introduce examinations for women, in 1869 and, a decade later, the first to admit women to degrees. In 1913, it appointed Caroline Spurgeon as only the second female professor at a British university, and in 1948 was the first British university to appoint a woman as its vice chancellor (chief executive). The university's member institutions house the oldest teaching hospitals in England.

The university consists of 17 member institutions and three central academic bodies The university has around 48,000 distance learning external students and around 219,410  campus-based internal students, making it the largest university by number of students in the United Kingdom. For most practical purposes, ranging from admissions to funding, the member institutions operate on an independent basis, with many awarding their own degrees whilst remaining in the federal university.

The largest colleges by enrolment are UCL, King's College London, City, Queen Mary, Birkbeck, the London School of Economics, Royal Holloway, and  Goldsmiths, each of which has over 9,000 students. Smaller, more specialist, colleges are the School of Oriental and African Studies (SOAS), St George's (medicine), the Royal Veterinary College, London Business School, the London School of Hygiene and Tropical Medicine, the Royal Central School of Speech and Drama, the Royal Academy of Music, the Courtauld Institute of Art, and the Institute of Cancer Research. Imperial College London was a member from 1908 until it became an independent university in 2008, and Heythrop College was a member from 1970 until its closure in 2018. City is the most recent constituent college, having joined on 1 September 2016.

Under the 2018 Act, member institutions ceased to be termed colleges and gained the right to seek university status without having to leave the federal university: Birkbeck, City, Goldsmiths’, King's College London, the LSE, the London School of Hygiene and Tropical Medicine, Queen Mary, the Royal Veterinary College, Royal Holloway, SOAS, St George's and UCL have all indicated that they intend to do so.

As of 2015, there are around 2 million University of London alumni across the world, including 12 monarchs or royalty, more than 60 presidents or prime ministers in the world (including 1 prime minister of the United Kingdom), 2 Cabinet Secretaries of UK, 85 Nobel laureates, 5 Fields Medallists, 4 Turing Award winners, 6 Grammy winners, 2 Oscar winners, 3 Olympic gold medalists and the "Father of the Nation" of several countries. The university owns University of London Press.

History

19th century

University College London (UCL) was founded under the name "London University" (but without recognition by the state) in 1826 as a secular alternative to the universities of Oxford and Cambridge, which limited their degrees to members of the established Church of England. As a result of the controversy surrounding UCL's establishment, King's College London was founded as an Anglican college by royal charter in 1829.

In 1830, UCL applied for a royal charter as a university which would allow it to confer degrees. This was rejected, but renewed in 1834. In response to this, opposition to "exclusive" rights grew among the London medical schools. The idea of a general degree awarding body for the schools was discussed in the medical press. and in evidence taken by the Select Committee on Medical Education. However, the blocking of a bill to open up Oxford and Cambridge degrees to dissenters led to renewed pressure on the Government to grant degree awarding powers to an institution that would not apply religious tests, particularly as the degrees of the new University of Durham were also to be closed to non-Anglicans.

In 1835, the government announced the response to UCL's petition for a charter. Two charters would be issued, one to UCL incorporating it as a college rather than a university, without degree awarding powers, and a second "establishing a Metropolitan University, with power to grant academical degrees to those who should study at the London University College, or at any similar institution which his Majesty might please hereafter to name".

Following the issuing of its charter on 28 November 1836, the new University of London started drawing up regulations for degrees in March 1837. The death of William IV in June, however, resulted in a problem – the charter had been granted "during our Royal will and pleasure", meaning it was annulled by the king's death. Queen Victoria issued a second charter on 5 December 1837, reincorporating the university. The university awarded its first degrees in 1839, all to students from UCL and King's College.

The university established by the charters of 1836 and 1837 was essentially an examining board with the right to award degrees in arts, laws and medicine. However, the university did not have the authority to grant degrees in theology, considered the senior faculty in the other three English universities. In medicine, the university was given the right to determine which medical schools provided sufficient medical training. In arts and law, by contrast, it would examine students from UCL, King's College, or any other institution granted a royal warrant, effectively giving the government control of which institutions could submit students for examination by the university. Beyond this right to submit students for examination, there was no other connection between the colleges and the university.

In 1849 the university held its first graduation ceremony at Somerset House following a petition to the senate from the graduates, who had previously received their degrees without any ceremony. About 250 students graduated at this ceremony. The London academic robes of this period were distinguished by their "rich velvet facings".

The list of institutions whose students could enter University of London examinations grew rapidly by 1858, including all other British universities as well as over 30 other schools and colleges outside of London. In that year, a new charter opened up the examinations to everyone, effectively abolishing the weak link between the university and the colleges. This led the Earl of Kimberley, a member of the university's senate, to tell the House of Lords in 1888 "that there were no Colleges affiliated to the University of London, though there were some many years ago". The reforms of 1858 also incorporated the graduates of the university into a convocation, similar to those of Oxford, Cambridge and Durham, and authorised the granting of degrees in science, the first BSc being awarded in 1860.

The expanded role meant the university needed more space, particularly with the growing number of students at the provincial university colleges. Between 1867 and 1870 a new headquarters was built at 6 Burlington Gardens, providing the university with exam halls and offices.

In 1863, via a fourth charter, the university gained the right to grant degrees in surgery. This 1863 charter remains the authority under which the university is incorporated, although all its other provisions were abolished under the 1898 University of London Act.

In 1878, the university set another first when it became the first university in the UK to admit women to degrees, via the grant of a supplemental charter. Four female students obtained Bachelor of Arts degrees in 1880 and two obtained Bachelor of Science degrees in 1881, again the first in the country.

In the late 19th century, the university came under criticism for merely serving as a centre for the administration of tests, and there were calls for a "teaching university" for London. UCL and KCL considered separating from the university to form a separate university, variously known as the Albert University, Gresham University and Westminster University. Following two royal commissions the University of London Act 1898 was passed, reforming the university and giving it a federal structure with responsibility for monitoring course content and academic standards within its institutions. This was implemented in 1900 with the approval of new statutes for the university.

20th century

The reforms initiated by the 1898 act came into force with the approval of the new federal statutes in 1900. Many of the colleges in London became schools of the university, including UCL, King's College, Bedford College, Royal Holloway and the London School of Economics. Regent's Park College, which had affiliated in 1841, became an official divinity school of the university in 1901 (the new statutes having given London the right to award degrees in theology) and Richmond (Theological) College followed as a divinity school of the university in 1902; Goldsmiths College joined in 1904; Imperial College was founded in 1907; Queen Mary College joined in 1915; the School of Oriental and African Studies was founded in 1916; and Birkbeck College, which was founded in 1823, joined in 1920.

The previous provision for colleges outside London was not abandoned on federation, instead London offered two routes to degrees: "internal" degrees offered by schools of the university and "external" degrees offered at other colleges (now the University of London flexible and distance learning programmes).

UCL and King's College, whose campaign for a teaching university in London had resulted in the university's reconstitution as a federal institution, went even further than becoming schools of the university and were actually merged into it. UCL's merger, under the 1905 University College London (Transfer) Act, happened in 1907. The charter of 1836 was surrendered and all of UCL's property became the University of London's. King's College followed in 1910 under the 1908 King's College London (Transfer) Act. This was a slightly more complicated case, as the theological department of the college (founded in 1846) did not merge into the university but maintained a separate legal existence under King's College's 1829 charter.

The expansion of the university's role meant that the Burlington Garden premises were insufficient, and in March 1900 it moved to the Imperial Institute in South Kensington. However, its continued rapid expansion meant that it had outgrown its new premises by the 1920s, requiring yet another move. A large parcel of land in Bloomsbury near the British Museum was acquired from the Duke of Bedford and Charles Holden was appointed architect with the instruction to create a building "not to suggest a passing fashion inappropriate to buildings which will house an institution of so permanent a character as a University." This unusual remit may have been inspired by the fact that William Beveridge, having just become director of LSE, upon asking a taxi driver to take him to the University of London was met with the response "Oh, you mean the place near the Royal School of Needlework". Holden responded by designing Senate House, the current headquarters of the university, and at the time of completion the second largest building in London.

The University of London contingent of the Officers' Training Corps (OTC) was formed in 1908 and had enrolled 950 students by autumn 1914. During the First World War, the OTC supplied 500 officers to the British Army between August 1914 and March 1915. Some 665 officers associated with the university died during the First World War and 245 officers in the Second World War.  the London University Officers' Training Corps (UOTC), drawn from 52 universities and colleges in the London area (not just the University of London), was the largest UOTC in the country, with about 400 officer cadets. It has been based at Yeomanry House in Handel Street, London since 1992. In 2011, Canterbury Company was founded to recruit officer cadets from universities in Kent.

During the Second World War, the colleges of the university (with the exception of Birkbeck) and their students left London for safer parts of the UK, while Senate House was used by the Ministry of Information, with its roof becoming an observation point for the Royal Observer Corps. Though the building was hit by bombs several times, it emerged from the war largely unscathed; rumour at the time had it that the reason the building had fared so well was that Adolf Hitler had planned to use it as his headquarters in London.

The latter half of the last century was less eventful. In 1948, Athlone Press was founded as the publishing house for the university, and sold to the Bemrose Corporation in 1979, subsequent to which it was acquired by Continuum publishing. However, the post-WWII period was mostly characterised by expansion and consolidation within the university, such as the acquisition as a constituent body of the Jesuit theological institution Heythrop College on its move from Oxfordshire in 1969.

The 1978 University of London Act saw the university defined as a federation of self-governing colleges, starting the process of decentralisation that would lead to a marked transference of academic and financial power in this period from the central authorities in Senate House to the individual colleges. In the same period, UCL and King's College regained their legal independence via acts of parliament and the issuing of new royal charters. UCL was reincorporated in 1977, while King's College's new charter in 1980 reunited the main body of the college with the corporation formed in 1829. In 1992 centralised graduation ceremonies at the Royal Albert Hall were replaced by individual ceremonies at the colleges. One of the largest shifts in power of this period came in 1993, when HEFCE (now the Office for Students, OfS) switched from funding the University of London, which then allocated money to the colleges, to funding the colleges directly and them paying a contribution to the university.

There was also a tendency in the late 20th century for smaller colleges to be amalgamated into larger "super-colleges". Some of the larger colleges (most notably UCL, King's College, LSE and Imperial) periodically put forward the possibility of their departure from the university, although no steps were taken to actually putting this into action until the early 21st century.

21st century

In 2002, Imperial College and UCL mooted the possibility of a merger, raising the question of the future of the University of London and the smaller colleges within it. Subsequently, considerable opposition from academic staff of both UCL and Imperial led to a rejection of the merger.

Despite this failure, the trend of decentralising power continued. A significant development in this process was the closing down of the Convocation of all the university's alumni in October 2003; this recognised that individual college alumni associations were now increasingly the centre of focus for alumni. However, the university continued to grow even as it moved to a looser federation, and, in 2005, admitted the Central School of Speech and Drama.

On 9 December 2005, Imperial College became the second constituent body (after Regent's Park College) to make a formal decision to leave the university. Its council announced that it was beginning negotiations to withdraw from the university in time for its own centenary celebrations, and in order to be able to award its own degrees. On 5 October 2006, the University of London accepted Imperial's formal request to withdraw from it. Imperial became fully independent on 9 July 2007, as part of the celebrations of the college's centenary.

The Times Higher Education Supplement announced in February 2007 that the London School of Economics, University College London and King's College London all planned to start awarding their own degrees, rather than degrees from the federal University of London as they had done previously, from the start of the academic year starting in Autumn 2007. Although this plan to award their own degrees did not amount to a decision to leave the University of London, the THES suggested that this "rais[ed] new doubts about the future of the federal University of London".

The School of Pharmacy, University of London, merged with UCL on 1 January 2012, becoming the UCL School of Pharmacy within the Faculty of Life Sciences. This was followed on 2 December 2014 by the Institute of Education also merging with UCL, becoming the UCL Institute of Education.

Since 2010, the university has been outsourcing support services such as cleaning and portering. This has prompted industrial action by the largely Latin American workforce under the "3Cosas" campaign (the 3Cosas – 3 things – being sick pay, holiday pay, and pensions for outsourced workers on parity with staff employed directly by the university). The 3Cosas campaigners were members of the UNISON trade union. However, documents leaked in 2014 revealed that UNISON representatives tried to counter the 3Cosas campaign in meetings with university management. The 3Cosas workers subsequently transferred to the Independent Workers Union of Great Britain.

Following good results in the Research Excellence Framework in December 2014, City University London said that they were exploring the possibility of joining the University of London. It was subsequently announced in July 2015 that City would join the University of London in August 2016. It will cease to be an independent university and become a college as "City, University of London".

In 2016 reforms were proposed that would see the colleges become member institutions and be allowed to legally become universities in their own right. A bill to amend the university's statutes was introduced into the House of Lords in late 2016. The bill was held up by procedural matters in the House of Commons, with MP Christopher Chope objecting to it receiving a second reading without debate and no time having been scheduled for such debate. Twelve of the colleges, including UCL and King's, said that they would seek university status once the bill was passed. The bill was debated and passed its second reading on 16 October 2018. It received royal assent on 20 December 2018. The twelve colleges (namely, all except The Courtauld, ICR, LBS, RAM and RCSSD) subsequently applied for university status, although stating they did not intend to change their names, with notice being given in the London Gazette on 4 February 2019.

In 2018, Heythrop College became the first major British higher education institution to close since the medieval University of Northampton in 1265. Its library of over 250,000 volumes was moved to the Senate House Library.

In 2019, the University of London Press, founded in 1910, was relaunched as a fully open-access publisher specializing in "distinctive scholarship at the forefront of the Humanities".

Campuses

The university owns a considerable central London estate of 12 hectares of freehold land in Bloomsbury, near Russell Square tube station.

Some of the university's colleges have their main buildings on the estate. The Bloomsbury Campus also contains eight Halls of Residence and Senate House, which houses Senate House Library, the chancellor's official residence and previously housed the School of Slavonic and East European Studies, now part of University College London (UCL) and housed in its own new building. Almost all of the School of Advanced Study is housed in Senate House and neighbouring Stewart House.

The university also owns many of the squares that formed part of the Bedford Estate, including Gordon Square, Tavistock Square, Torrington Square and Woburn Square, as well as several properties outside Bloomsbury, with many of the university's colleges and institutes occupying their own estates across London:
 Clare Market,
 The Aldwych, where the London School of Economics and Political Science and part of King's College London are based
 The North and East Wings of Somerset House, the location for the Courtauld Institute of Art and King's College London, respectively
 St Bartholomew's Hospital,
 the University of London Boat Club in Chiswick, and
 The campus of Royal Holloway and Bedford New College including the historic Founder's Building.

The university also has several properties outside London, including a number of residential and catering units further afield and the premises of the University of London Institute in Paris, which offers undergraduate and postgraduate degrees in French and historical studies.

Organisation and administration

The university's board of trustees, the governing and executive body of the university, comprises eleven appointed independent persons – all of whom are non-executive; the vice-chancellor, the deputy vice chancellor and four heads of member institutions, appointed by the Collegiate Council.

The board of trustees is supported by the Collegiate Council, which comprises the heads of the member institutions of the university, the deputy vice-chancellor, the dean and chief executive of the School of Advanced Study, the chief executive of the University of London Worldwide and the Collegiate Council's chair, the vice-chancellor.

Chancellors

The chancellors of the University of London since its founding are as follows:
 William Cavendish, 2nd Earl of Burlington, 1836–1856
 Granville Leveson-Gower, 2nd Earl Granville, 1856–1891
 Edward Stanley, 15th Earl of Derby, 1891–1893
 Farrer Herschell, 1st Baron Herschell, 1893–1899
 John Wodehouse, 1st Earl of Kimberley, 1899–1902
 Archibald Primrose, 5th Earl of Rosebery, 1902–1929
 William Lygon, 7th Earl Beauchamp, 1929–1931
 Alexander Cambridge, 1st Earl of Athlone, 1932–1955
 Queen Elizabeth The Queen Mother, 1955–1981
 Princess Anne (The Princess Royal from 1987), 1981–present

Member institutions

For most practical purposes, ranging from admission of students to negotiating funding from the government, the 17 member institutions are treated as individual universities. Legally speaking they are known as Recognised Bodies, with the authority to examine students and award them degrees of the university. Some member institutions also have the power to award their own degrees instead of those of the university; those which exercise that power include:
 City, University of London
 Goldsmiths, University of London
 King's College London
 London Business School
 London School of Economics and Political Science
 Queen Mary University of London
 Royal Holloway, University of London
 SOAS, University of London
 St George's, University of London
 University College London

Most decisions affecting the member institutions and institutes of the University of London are made at the level of the member institutions or institutes themselves. The University of London does retain its own decision-making structure, however, with the Collegiate Council and board of trustees, responsible for matters of academic policy. The Collegiate Council is made up of the heads of member institutions of the university.

The 12 institutes, or Listed Bodies, within the University of London offer courses leading to degrees that are both examined and awarded by the University of London. Additionally, twelve universities in England, several in Canada and many in other Commonwealth countries (notably in East Africa) began life as associate colleges of the university offering such degrees. By the 1970s, almost all of these colleges had achieved independence from the University of London. An increasing number of overseas and UK-based academic institutes offer courses to support students registered for the University of London flexible and distance learning diplomas and degrees and the Teaching Institutions Recognition Framework enables the recognition of these institutions.

Member Institutions

Under the University of London Act 2018, a member institution is defined as "an educational, academic or research institution which is a constituent member of the University and has for the time being― (a) the status of a college under the statutes; or (b) the status of a university". As of February 2019, 12 of the colleges of the university have said they are seeking university status. This does not affect their status as member institution of the university or the degrees they award. The member institutions of the University of London (as of September 2018) are:

Central academic bodies

 University of London (Worldwide)
 University of London Institute in Paris, formerly known as the British Institute in Paris
 School of Advanced Study comprising the following institutes:
 the Institute of Advanced Legal Studies
 the Institute of Classical Studies
 the Institute of Commonwealth Studies
 the Institute of English Studies
 the Institute of Historical Research
 the Institute of Latin American Studies
 the Institute of Modern Languages Research
 the Institute of Philosophy
 the Warburg Institute

Former colleges and schools
Some colleges and schools of the University of London have been amalgamated into larger colleges, closed or left the University of London. Those amalgamated with larger colleges include (listed by current parent institution):

King's College London
 Chelsea College – Manresa Road, Chelsea
 Queen Elizabeth College – Campden Hill Road, Kensington
 Institute of Psychiatry – split from Maudsley Hospital, merged with King's College London in 1997
 United Medical and Dental Schools of Guy's and St Thomas' Hospitals – merged with King's College London in 1998, now part of King's College School of Medicine and Dentistry
Queen Mary, University of London
 Westfield College – Kidderpore Avenue, Hampstead; now part of Queen Mary and Westfield College (the registered royal charter title of Queen Mary, University of London)
Royal Holloway, University of London
 Bedford College – Inner Circle Regent's Park; now part of Royal Holloway and Bedford New College (the legal title of Royal Holloway, University of London, under its establishing act of parliament)
 Institute of Musical Research – moved from School of Advanced Study in 2015
UCL
 The School of Pharmacy, University of London; merged with UCL on 1 January 2012
 School of Slavonic and East European Studies
 Institute of Education; merged with UCL on 2 December 2014

Institutions that have closed or left the university include:

 Heythrop College – closed 2018
 University Marine Biological Station, Millport, closed in 2013, now run by Field Studies Council
 Imperial College London – became independent in July 2007 This had previously absorbed:
 Wye College – Wye, Kent; Wye courses are now run by the University of Kent in partnership with Imperial, and graduating students receive a University of Kent degree and an Imperial Associateship of Wye College
 Royal Postgraduate Medical School; now part of the Imperial College School of Medicine
 New College London, closed in 1980.
 The Lister Institute of Preventive Medicine, Chelsea, London, founded 1891. In 1978 became a science funding body
 Richmond (Theological) College was closed as a theological college in 1972 with the campus being transferred to The American International University in London
 Regent's Park College moved to Oxford in 1927, becoming a permanent private hall of the University of Oxford from 1957

University colleges in the external degree programme

A number of major universities originated as university colleges teaching external degrees of the University of London. These include:
 Mason College, Birmingham, awarded a royal charter in 1900 as the University of Birmingham.
 Owen's College Manchester, became part of the Victoria University in 1880, awarded a royal charter in 1903 as the Victoria University of Manchester.
 University College Liverpool, became part of the Victoria University in 1884, awarded a royal charter in 1903 as the University of Liverpool.
 Yorkshire College, Leeds, became part of the Victoria University in 1887, awarded a royal charter in 1904 as the University of Leeds.
 Firth College, Sheffield, awarded a royal charter in 1905 as the University of Sheffield.
 Bristol University College, awarded a royal charter in 1909 as the University of Bristol.
 University College Reading, awarded a royal charter in 1926 as the University of Reading.
 Ceylon University College, established by the Ceylon University Ordinance Act in 1942 as the University of Ceylon.
 University College Nottingham, awarded a royal charter in 1948 as the University of Nottingham.
 Hartley University College, Southampton, awarded a royal charter in 1952 as the University of Southampton.
 University College Hull, awarded a royal charter in 1954 as the University of Hull.
 University College of the South West of England, Exeter, awarded a royal charter in 1955 as the University of Exeter.
 University College Leicester, awarded a royal charter in 1957 as the University of Leicester.
 University College of South Wales and Monmouthshire, Cardiff, joined the University of Wales in 1893 and became Cardiff University in 2005.
 University College of Wales, Aberystwyth, joined the University of Wales in 1893 and became Aberystwyth University in 2007.
 University College of North Wales, Bangor, joined the University of Wales in 1893 and became Bangor University in 2007.

A number of other colleges had degrees validated and awarded by the University of London.
 St. Patrick's, Carlow College, Ireland – from 1840 to 1892 students studied for primary degrees in Arts (BA) and Law (BLL).
 St. Patrick's College, Thurles, Ireland – from 1849 the University of London, allowed Thurles to offer degrees.
 Huddersfield College
 Queen's College, Birmingham
 Stonyhurst College, a Catholic college in Lancashire.
 Wesleyan Collegiate Institution, Taunton, which became Queen's College, Taunton.
 Ceylon Technical College, 1933 – 1950 students studied for engineering degrees in BSc in engineering.
 University College Lahore
 Singapore Institute of Management
 Northwest College for Advanced Learning, India

Colleges in special relation

Between 1946 and 1970, the university entered into 'schemes of special relation' with university colleges in the Commonwealth of Nations. These schemes encouraged the development of independent universities by offering a relationship with the University of London. University colleges in these countries were granted a royal charter. An academic board of the university college negotiated with the University of London over the entrance requirements for the admission of students, syllabuses, examination procedures and other academic matters. During the period of the special relationship, graduates of the colleges were awarded University of London degrees.

Some of the colleges which were in special relation are listed below, along with the year in which their special relation was established.
 1946 – The University College of the West Indies, until 1961. (Now the University of the West Indies)
 1948 – University College of the Gold Coast, (now University of Ghana)
 1948 – University College, Ibadan, until 1967. (Now the University of Ibadan)
 1956 – University College of Rhodesia and Nyasaland (now the University of Zimbabwe).
 1961 – Royal College Nairobi (now the University of Nairobi).
 1963 – University of East Africa

In 1970, the 'Schemes of Special Relation' were phased out.

Coat of arms

The University of London received a grant of arms in April 1838. The arms depict a cross of St George upon which there is a Tudor rose surrounded by detailing and surmounted by a crown. Above all of this there is a blue field with an open book upon it.

The arms are described in the grant as:

Argent, the Cross of St George, thereon the Union Rose irradiated and ensigned with the Imperial Crown proper, a Chief Azure, thereon an open Book also proper, Clasps gold

Academic dress

The University of London had established a rudimentary code for academic dress by 1844. The university was the first to devise a system of academic dress based on faculty colours, an innovation that was subsequently followed by many other universities.

Colleges that award their own degrees have their own academic dress for those degrees.

Student life

In ,  students (approximately 5% of all UK students) attended one of the University of London's affiliated schools. Additionally, over 50,000 students are part of University of London Worldwide.

The ULU building on Malet Street (close to Senate House) was home to the University of London Union, which acted as the student union for all University of London students alongside the individual college and institution unions. The building is now rebranded as "Student Central, London", offering full membership to current University of London students, and associate membership to students at other universities, and other groups. The union previously owned London Student, the largest student newspaper in Europe, which now runs as a digital news organisation

Sports, clubs and traditions
Though most sports teams are organised at the college level, ULU ran several sports clubs of its own, some of which (for example the rowing team) compete in BUCS leagues. The union also organised leagues for college teams to participate in. These leagues and sports clubs are supported by Friends of University of London Sport which aims to promote them.

In addition to these, ULU catered for sports not covered by the individual colleges through clubs such as the University of London Union Lifesaving Club, which helps students gain awards and learn new skills in lifesaving as well as sending teams to compete throughout the country in the BULSCA league.

ULU also organised several societies, ranging from Ballroom and Latin American Dance to Shaolin Kung Fu, and from the University of London Big Band to the Breakdancing Society. Affiliated to the university is the University of London Society of Change Ringers, a society for bellringers at all London universities.

The university runs the University of London Boat Club.

Student housing

The university operates eight intercollegiate halls of residence, which accommodate students from most of its colleges and member institutions:
 Bonham Carter and Warwickshire House, Gower Street, WC1E
 College Hall, Malet Street, WC1E
 Connaught Hall, Tavistock Square, WC1H
 Eleanor Rosa House, Lett Road, E15
 Garden Halls, Cartwright Gardens, WC1H
 Handel Mansions, Handel Street, WC1N
 International Hall, Lansdown Terrace, WC1N
 Nutford House, Brown Street, W1H

Notable people

Alumni

A large number of famous individuals have passed through the University of London, either as staff or students, including at least 12 monarchs or royalty, 52 presidents or prime ministers, 84 Nobel laureates, 6 Grammy winners, 2 Oscar winners, 1 Ekushey Padak winner and 3 Olympic gold medalists. The collegiate research university has also produced Father of the Nation for several countries, including several members of Colonial Service and Imperial Civil Service during the British Raj and the British Empire.

Staff and students of the university, past and present, have contributed to a number of important scientific advances, including the discovery of vaccines by Edward Jenner and Henry Gray (author of Gray's Anatomy). Additional vital progress was made by University of London people in the following fields: the discovery of the structure of DNA (Francis Crick, Maurice Wilkins and Rosalind Franklin); the invention of modern electronic computers (Tommy Flowers); the discovery of penicillin (Alexander Fleming and Ernest Chain); the development of X-ray technology (William Henry Bragg and Charles Glover Barkla); discoveries on the mechanism of action of Interleukin 10 (Anne O'Garra); the formulation of the theory of electromagnetism (James Clerk Maxwell); the determination of the speed of light (Louis Essen); the development of antiseptics (Joseph Lister); the development of fibre optics (Charles K. Kao); and the invention of the telephone (Alexander Graham Bell).

Notable political figures who have passed through the university include Muhammad Haji Ibrahim Egal, Romano Prodi, Junichiro Koizumi, Aung San Suu Kyi, Ramsay MacDonald, Desmond Tutu, Basdeo Panday, Taro Aso, Walter Rodney, Nelson Mandela, B. R. Ambedkar and Mahatma Gandhi. 35th President of the United States John F. Kennedy filed an application and paid fees for a year's study at the LSE, but later fell ill and left the university without taking a single class.

Academic staff

In the arts, culture and literature the university has produced many notable figures. Writers include novelists Malcolm Bradbury, G. K. Chesterton, H. G. Wells, Thomas Hardy, Arthur C. Clarke and J. G. Ballard. Futurologist Donald Prell.  Artists associated with the university include Jonathan Myles-Lea, and several of the leading figures in the Young British Artists movement (including Ian Davenport, Tracey Emin and Damien Hirst). Outstanding musicians across a wide range include the conductor Sir Simon Rattle, the soprano Felicity Lott and both members of Gilbert and Sullivan, to Mick Jagger, Elton John, Dido, Pakistani singer Nazia Hassan (known in South Asia as the "Queen of Pop"), and Hong Kong singer Karen Mok, composer Florence Margaret Spencer Palmer, and members of the bands Coldplay, Keane, Suede, The Velvet Underground, Blur, Iron Maiden, Placebo, The Libertines, and Queen.

The university has also played host to film directors (Christopher Nolan, Derek Jarman), philosophers (Karl Popper, Roger Scruton), explorers (David Livingstone), international academics (Sam Karunaratne), Riccarton High School Head of Commerce, Tom Neumann and leading businessmen (Michael Cowpland, George Soros).

Honorary alumni
The University of London presented its first honorary degrees in June 1903. This accolade has been bestowed on several monarchs of the United Kingdom, many members of British royal family and a wide range of distinguished individuals from both the academic and non-academic worlds. Honorary degrees are approved by the Collegiate Council, part of the university's governance structure.

Controversy
In recent years the University of London has seen much controversy surrounding its treatment of staff and students.

In 2012, outsourced cleaning staff ran the "3 Cosas" campaign, fighting for improvements in three areas – sick pay, holiday and pensions. After over a year of high-profile strikes, protests and occupations, concessions were made by the university in terms of sick pay and holidays, however these improvements were nowhere near to the extent of what was being demanded by the campaign.

In 2013, after a student occupation in favour of ten demands, including fair pay for workers, a halt to privatisation of the university and an end to plans to shut down the university's student union ULU, police were called, resulting in the violent eviction and arrests of over 60 students, as well as police violence towards students outside supporting the occupation. After these events, a high-profile "Cops Off Campus" demonstration was held against the university's security policies, with thousands in attendance.

In 2018, an article was published by Vice that reported on concerns over the university's security arrangements at Senate House, where over 25 extra private security staff had been brought in. Students who had been involved in an occupation of Senate House were barred from using university facilities, and there were numerous allegations of students being verbally, physically and sexually assaulted by the temporary security staff.

In December 2018, the Independent Workers' Union of Great Britain called for a boycott of events at the university's central administration buildings, including Senate House, with the aim of putting pressure on the University of London to bring outsourced cleaning, catering and security staff in-house by targeting a revenue stream worth around £40 million per year.

In May 2019, the congress of the University and College Union, voted to boycott the University of London's central administration buildings including Senate House, raising the pressure on the University of London. Dr Dion Georgiou, an academic supporting the boycott and a member of UCU, wrote a comment piece for The Guardian shortly before the vote, urging the congress to approve the motion and claiming that "[outsourced workers] face an intransigent university management, whose response has frequently blended short-termism with heavy-handedness". The motion was passed two days later.

The federal model elsewhere
In 1850, Queen's University of Ireland was created as a federal university to provide degrees for students from the colleges established at Belfast, Cork and Galway. This was succeeded in 1879 by the Royal University of Ireland, an examining university along the model of the University of London, which was in turn succeeded by the federal National University of Ireland in 1908. When the University of New Zealand was constituted in 1874, it was a federal university modelled on the University of London, functioning principally as an examining body. University of the Cape of Good Hope, when it was constituted in 1875 and authorised to be responsible for examinations throughout South Africa. In Canada, similar structures were adopted, but on a regional basis. The University of Toronto acted as an examining and degree awarding body for the province of Ontario from 1853 to 1887, by utilising an operating model based on that of University of London.

In India, to satisfy the urge for higher education and learning, three universities were set up at three presidency towns in 1857 on the model of University of London as affiliating universities, viz., University of Calcutta, University of Mumbai and University of Madras.

The University of Wales was established in 1893 on a federal model incorporating (originally) colleges in Aberystwyth, Bangor and Cardiff. A decision to dissolve the University of Wales was made in 2017.

Literature and popular culture

Literature
Dr. Watson, a fictional character in the Sherlock Holmes stories by Sir Arthur Conan Doyle, received his medical degree from Barts and The London School of Medicine and Dentistry (now part of QMUL) and met Sherlock Holmes in the chemical laboratory there. Jim Hacker, a fictional character in the 1980s British sitcom Yes Minister and its sequel Yes, Prime Minister, received his degree, a third, from the university (LSE).

During the Second World War, the Senate House, London use by the Ministry of Information inspired two noted English writers: Graham Greene's novel The Ministry of Fear (1943) and its film adaptation Ministry of Fear by Fritz Lang (1944) set in Bloomsbury. George Orwell's wife Eileen worked in Senate House for the Censorship Department of the Ministry of Information, and her experiences inspired the description of the Ministry of Truth in Orwell's 1949 novel Nineteen Eighty-Four.

Films and others
A lecturer at the university (SOAS) named William McGovern was one of the real-life inspirations of the film character Indiana Jones.

Senate House and the constituent colleges of the University of London have been featured in Hollywood and British films.

In year 1916, Alfred Hitchcock enrolled at the University of London and took evening courses and drawing and design classes, and later in 1920 helped land him a spot designing title cards.

See also
 Armorial of UK universities
 Golden triangle (universities)
 List of modern universities in Europe (1801–1945)
 List of universities in the UK
 Third-oldest university in England debate
 United Hospitals

Notes

References

Further reading

External links 

 
 University of London Archives
 University of London student lists
 The University of London Act 1994
 University of London military service,1914–1945

 
Educational institutions established in 1836
Exempt charities
1836 establishments in the United Kingdom
1836 establishments in England
Universities established in the 19th century
1836 in London
Universities in London